The Stadium at South Field, more commonly known simply as "South Field", is a soccer-specific stadium in Provo, Utah on the campus of Brigham Young University.

The stadium serves as home to BYU Cougars men's soccer, BYU Cougars women's soccer, BYU Men's Rugby, and BYU Women's Rugby.  Hanson Sports was the contractor selected to construct the bleachers at South Field in 2008. The stadium now features a grandstand with seating capacity up to 4,200 spectators, with additional standing room for larger crowds.  The attendance record at South Field has been broken several times in the past few years, most recently in September 2015 when 5,620 fans attended a women's soccer match between host BYU and rival University of Utah.

Due to its well-maintained natural grass playing surface, South Field served as the practice facility for the United States Men's National Soccer Team prior to their World Cup qualifying match against Costa Rica in 2005.

References

External links
 

Sports venues in Utah County, Utah
Soccer venues in Utah
College soccer venues in the United States
Brigham Young University buildings
Sports venues completed in 2008
Rugby union stadiums in Utah
2008 establishments in Utah